Wonder Boys is a 1995 novel by the American writer Michael Chabon. It was adapted into a film with the same title in 2000.

Plot summary
Pittsburgh professor and author Grady Tripp is working on an unwieldy 2,611-page manuscript that is meant to be the follow-up to his successful, award-winning novel The Land Downstairs, which was published seven years earlier.  On the eve of a college-sponsored writers' and publishers' weekend called WordFest, Tripp's wife walks out on him, and he learns that his mistress, the chancellor of the college, Sara Gaskell, is pregnant with his child.  To top it all off, Tripp finds himself involved in a bizarre crime committed by one of his students, an alienated young writer named James Leer.  During a party, Leer shoots and kills the chancellor’s dog and steals her husband’s prized Marilyn Monroe collectible: the jacket worn by the actress on the day of her marriage to Joe DiMaggio.

The New York Times reviewed the novel as "...the ultimate writing-program novel. If that sounds insulting, I don't mean it to be. But anyone who has ever served time in a writing program and gone to the "writing festivals" at various universities will instantly recognize the milieu and the characters."

Inspiration
The novel grew from Chabon’s concerns with completing an unrealized novel, Fountain City, about the construction of a perfect baseball park in Florida. He decided to write a story about, in part, an author who couldn’t finish his own work. The main character of Grady Tripp is admittedly based on University of Pittsburgh professor, Chuck Kinder, who taught the undergraduate Chabon in the early 1980s. Kinder’s great opus, a novel inspired by his friendship with author Raymond Carver, was reportedly more than 3000 pages long at one point. It was finally published in a very slimmed-down version in 2001 as Honeymooners: A Cautionary Tale.

References

External links
 San Francisco Chronicle article

1995 American novels
Novels by Michael Chabon
American novels adapted into films
Novels about writers
Novels set in Pittsburgh
Villard (imprint) books
Novels about teachers